Gapper may refer to:

 John Gapper (born 1959), British editor and journalist
John Gapper (MP)
 Gapper (mascot), a Major League Baseball mascot for the Cincinnati Reds
 Agkistrodon piscivorus, a.k.a. the cottonmouth, a venomous pit viper found in North America

See also
 Gap (disambiguation)